Junction Road may refer to:

 Junction Road, Hong Kong, a road in Kowloon, Hong Kong
 Junction Road, London, a section of the A400 road in Upper Holloway, north London